Sir Francis Brian Anthony Rundall  (11 September 1908 – 7 July 1987) was a British diplomat. He served as British Ambassador to Israel from 1957 to 1959 and British Ambassador to Japan from 1963 to 1967.

Early life
Rundall was born in Kent, England on 11 September 1908. He was educated at Marlborough College, followed by the University of Cambridge and the University of Berlin.

Career
Rundall entered the Diplomatic Service in 1930 as a consular officer. He subsequently served as Head of the North American Department of the Foreign Office from 1947 to 1948, Head of the United Nations (Economic and Social) Department and Refugee Department of the Foreign Office from 1948 to 1949, an inspector from 1949 to 1953, New York Consul-General from 1953 to 1957, Ambassador to Israel from 1957 to 1959, Deputy Under-Secretary for Foreign Affairs and Chief Clerk from 1959 to 1963 and Ambassador to Japan from 1963 to 1967.

He was appointed a GCMG on 1 January 1968.

Personal life
Rundall married Mary Syrett on 26 January 1935. His hobby was trout fishing. By 1956 he lived at 1 Beekman Place in New York and had two children being schooled in England. He died on 7 July 1987.

References

1908 births
1987 deaths
Ambassadors of the United Kingdom to Japan
Ambassadors of the United Kingdom to Israel
20th-century British diplomats
People educated at Marlborough College
Alumni of the University of Cambridge
Humboldt University of Berlin alumni
Knights Grand Cross of the Order of St Michael and St George
Officers of the Order of the British Empire
People from Kent